The Ministry of Industry and Technology is a government ministry office of the Republic of Turkey, responsible for industrial and commercial affairs in Turkey. The ministry is headed by Mustafa Varank.

References

External links
https://twitter.com/TCSanayi

Science, Industry and Technology
Turkey
Turkey
Ministries established in 1984
1984 establishments in Turkey